Kat O also named Crooked Island, is an island in Northeast Hong Kong.

Administration
Administratively, Kat O is part of North District. It is a recognized village under the New Territories Small House Policy.

Geography

Kat O is located in the west of Mirs Bay. With an area of 2.35 km², it is the largest island in North District, the second largest being Wong Wan Chau (Double Island). Neighbouring islands include: Ap Chau, Ngo Mei Chau (Crescent Island), and Pak Sha Chau (Round Island). The village of Tung O is located on its northwest coast. Its highest point is Kai Kung Leng, which is 122 m above sea level.

O Pui Tong is a bay surrounded by the crook-shaped Crooked Island and Yeung Chau. O Pui Tong, together with the northwestern waters of Kat O, are two of the 26 designated marine fish culture zones in Hong Kong.

History
Kat O was once a major fishing market in Hong Kong, and long served as an important stopover for boats travelling between Hong Kong and the rest of China.

During the Ming dynasty, a decree required all inhabitants to leave the island. Then in the 1660s, soon after the end of the dynasty, it was re-settled by Hakka people. Other residents were Tanka fishermen.

The Tin Hau Temple at Kat O was estimated to be built in 1763. It is listed as a Grade III historic building. Part of the temple building was used for the Tat O School until the school was moved to a new location in 1957.
A Pak Kung Shrine is also located in the vicinity.

The island is home to three cannons. These are thought to have been made in the west, during the 19th century.

Conservation
Kat O was part of the Plover Cove (Extension) Country Park since 1979.

The Kat O Nature Trail spans 1 km long, stretching from the Kat O Ferry Pier to Ko Tei Teng.

The Kat O Geoheritage Centre (at No. 142 Kat O Main Street) was opened in 2010 by Kat O villagers, volunteer groups and the government to raise public awareness of geo-conservation, as part of the Hong Kong Geopark.

See also

 Crooked Harbour
 Double Haven
 Pat Sin Leng Country Park

References

Further reading

External links

 Delineation of area of existing village Kat O (Sha Tau Kok) for election of resident representative (2019 to 2022)
 Kut-O Chinese Association (Kent area) Website
 Pictures of Kat O: , 
 Hong Kong Geopark: "Lee Yuk Ying Introduces the Cultural History of Kat O to Visitors".
 Webpage about Kat O
 Antiquities Advisory Board. Pictures of Tin Hau Temple, Sai O, Kat O
 How to visit two of Hong Kong's most remote islands in one day CNN.com

Islands of Hong Kong
North District, Hong Kong
Hong Kong UNESCO Global Geopark
Populated places in Hong Kong